The 2021 Sundance Film Festival took place from January 28 to February 3, 2021. The first lineup of competition films was announced on December 15, 2020. Due to the COVID-19 pandemic in Utah, the festival combined in-person screenings at the Ray Theatre in Park City, with screenings held online as well as on screens and drive-ins in 24 states and territories across the United States.

Films

U.S. Dramatic Competition 
 CODA, written and directed by Siân Heder
 I Was a Simple Man, written and directed by Christopher Makoto Yogi
 Jockey, directed and co-written by Clint Bentley
 John and the Hole, directed by Pascual Sisto
 Mayday, written, directed and co-produced by Karen Cinorre
 On the Count of Three, directed by Jerrod Carmichael
 Passing, written, directed and produced by Rebecca Hall
 Superior, directed by Erin Vassilopoulos
 Together Together, written and directed by Nikole Beckwith
 Wild Indian, written and directed by Lyle Mitchell Corbine Jr.

U.S. Documentary Competition 
 Ailey, directed and co-produced by Jamila Wignot
 All Light, Everywhere, written and directed by Theo Anthony
 At the Ready, directed by Maisie Crow
 Cusp, directed by Parker Hill and Isabel Bethencourt
 Homeroom, directed and co-produced by Peter Nicks
 Rebel Hearts, directed, co-written and co-edited by Pedro Kos
 Rita Moreno: Just a Girl Who Decided to Go for It, directed, co-produced and co-edited by Mariem Pérez Riera
 Summer of Soul, directed by Questlove
 Try Harder!, directed and co-produced by Debbie Lum
 Users, directed by Natalia Almada

Premieres 
 Amy Tan: Unintended Memoir, directed by James Redford
 Bring Your Own Brigade, written, produced and directed by Lucy Walker
 The Cursed (original festival title: Eight for Silver), written and directed by Sean Ellis 
 How It Ends, written, directed and produced by Daryl Wein and Zoe Lister-Jones
 In the Earth, written and directed by Ben Wheatley
 In the Same Breath, directed and co-produced by Nanfu Wang
 Judas and the Black Messiah, directed and co-written by Shaka King
 Land, directed by Robin Wright
 Marvelous and the Black Hole, directed by Kate Tsang
 Mass, written and directed by Fran Kranz
 The Most Beautiful Boy in the World, written and directed by Kristina Lindström and Kristian Petri
 My Name Is Pauli Murray, directed by Betsy West and Julie Cohen
 Philly D.A., directed by Ted Passon, Yoni Brook and Nicole Salazard
 Prisoners of the Ghostland, directed by Sion Sono
 The Sparks Brothers, directed by Edgar Wright
 Street Gang: How We Got to Sesame Street, directed by Marilyn Agrelo

World Cinema Dramatic Competition 
 The Dog Who Wouldn't Be Quiet, directed by Ana Katz
 El Planeta, written and directed by Amalia Ulman
 Fire in the Mountains, written and directed by Ajitpal Singh
 Hive, written and directed by Blerta Basholli
 Human Factors, written and directed by Ronny Trocker
 Luzzu, written and directed by Alex Camilleri
 One for the Road, directed by Nattawut Poonpiriya
 The Pink Cloud, written and directed by Iuli Gerbase
 Pleasure, written and directed by Ninja Thyberg
 Prime Time, directed and co-written by Jakub Piątek

World Cinema Documentary Competition 
 Faya Dayi, written, directed and produced by Jessica Beshir
 Flee, directed and co-written by Jonas Poher Rasmussen
 Misha and the Wolves, directed by Sam Hobkinson
 The Most Beautiful Boy in the World, written and directed by Kristina Lindström and Kristian Petri
 Playing with Sharks, directed by Sally Aitken
 President, directed by Camilla Nielsson
 Sabaya, directed and edited by Hogir Hirori
 Taming the Garden, directed by Salomé Jashi
 Writing with Fire, directed by Rintu Thomas and Sushmit Ghosh

Midnight 
 Censor, directed by Prano Bailey-Bond
 Knocking, directed by Frida Kempff
 A Glitch in the Matrix, directed by Rodney Ascher
 Coming Home in the Dark, directed and co-written by James Ashcroft
 Mother Schmuckers, written and directed by Lenny Guit and Harpo Guit
 Violation, written and directed by Madeleine Sims-Fewer and Dusty Mancinelli

Next 
 The Blazing World, directed and co-written by Carlson Young
 Cryptozoo, written and directed by Dash Shaw
 First Date, written and directed by Manuel Crosby and Darren Knapp
 Ma Belle, My Beauty, directed by Marion Hill
 R#J, directed and co-written by Carey Williams
 Searchers, directed by Pacho Velez
 Son of Monarchs, written and directed by Alexis Gambis
 Strawberry Mansion, written and directed by Albert Birney ans Kentucker Audley
 We're All Going to the World's Fair, written, directed and edited by Jane Schoenbrun

Spotlight
 Night of the Kings, directed by Philippe Lacôte
 The World to Come, directed by Mona Fastvold

Shorts

U.S. Fiction 

 Ava from My Class, directed by Youmin Kang
 Bambirak, directed by Zamarin Wahdat
 BJ's Mobile Gift Shop, directed by Jason Park
 Bruiser, directed by Miles Warren
 Don't Go Tellin' Your Momma, directed by Topaz Jones, rubberband.
 Doublespeak, directed by Hazel McKibbin
 i ran from it and was still in it, directed by Darol Olu Kae
 In the Air Tonight, directed by Andrew Norman Wilson
 LATA, directed by Alisha Mehta
 Raspberry, directed by Julian Doan
 The Touch of the Master's Hand, directed by Gregory Barnes
 White Wedding, directed by Melody C Roscher
 Wiggle Room, directed by Sam Guest and Julia Baylis
 Yoruga, directed by Federico Torrado Tobón
 You Wouldn't Understand, directed by Trish Harnetiaux

International Fiction 

 The Affected, directed by Rikke Gregersen
 Black Bodies, directed by Kelly Fyffe-Marshall
 The Criminals, directed by Serhat Karaaslan
 Excuse Me, Miss, Miss, Miss, directed by Sonny Calvento
 Five Tiger, directed by Nomawonga Khumalo
 Flex, directed by Josefin Malmén, David Strindberg
 Like the Ones I Used to Know (Les Grandes claques), directed by Annie St-Pierre
 Lizard, directed by Akinola Davies, Jr.
 The Longest Dream I Remember, directed by Carlos Lenin
 Mountain Cat, directed by Lkhagvadulam Purev-Ochir
 Unliveable, directed by Matheus Farias and Enock Carvalho
 The Unseen River, directed by Phạm Ngọc Lân
 We're Not Animals, directed by Noé Debré

Non-Fiction 

 A Concerto Is a Conversation, directed by Ben Proudfoot and Kris Bowers
 Dear Philadelphia, directed by Renee Osubu
 The Field Trip, directed by Meghan O'Hara, Mike Attie and Rodrigo Ojeda-Beck
 My Own Landscapes, directed by Antoine Chapon
 The Rifleman, directed by Sierra Pettengill
 Snowy, directed by Kaitlyn Schwalje and Alex Wolf Lewis
 Spirits and Rocks: An Azorean Myth, directed by Aylin Gökmen
 Tears Teacher, directed by Noemie Nakai
 This Is the Way We Rise, directed by Ciara Lacy
 To Know Her, directed by Natalie Chao
 When We Were Bullies, written, directed and produced by Jay Rosenblatt
 Up at Night, directed by Nelson Makengo

Animation 

 The Fire Next Time, directed by Renaldho Pelle
 Forever, directed by Mitch McGlocklin
 The Fourfold, directed by Alisi Telengut
 Ghost Dogs, directed by Joe Cappa
 GNT, directed by Sara Hirner and Rosemary Vasquez-Brown
 KKUM, directed by Kang-min Kim
 Little Miss Fate, directed by Joder von Rotz
 Misery Loves Company, directed by Sasha Lee
 Souvenir Souvenir, directed by Bastien Dubois
 Trepanation, directed by Nick Flaherty

Awards 
The following awards were given out:

Grand Jury Prizes
 U.S. Dramatic Competition – CODA (Siân Heder)
 U.S. Documentary Competition – Summer of Soul (Ahmir “Questlove” Thompson)
 World Cinema Dramatic Competition – Hive (Blerta Basholli)
 World Cinema Documentary Competition – Flee (Jonas Poher Rasmussen)

Audience Awards
 U.S. Dramatic Competition – CODA (Siân Heder)
 U.S. Documentary Competition – Summer of Soul (Ahmir “Questlove” Thompson)
 World Cinema Dramatic Competition – Hive (Blerta Basholli)
 World Cinema Documentary Competition – Writing with Fire (Rintu Thomas and Sushmit Ghosh)
 NEXT – Ma Belle, My Beauty (Marion Hill)

Directing, Screenwriting and Editing
 U.S. Dramatic Competition – Siân Heder for CODA
 U.S. Documentary Competition – Natalia Almada for Users
 World Cinema Dramatic Competition – Blerta Basholli for Hive
 World Cinema Documentary Competition – Hogir Hirori for Sabaya
 Waldo Salt Screenwriting Award – Ari Katcher and Ryan Welch for On the Count of Three
 Jonathan Oppenheim Editing Award: U.S. Documentary – Kristina Motwani and Rebecca Adorno for Homeroom
 NEXT Innovator Price - Dash Shaw for Cryptozoo

Special Jury Prizes
 U.S. Dramatic Special Jury Award for Ensemble Cast – The cast of CODA 
 U.S. Dramatic Special Jury Award: Best Actor - Clifton Collins Jr. for Jockey
 U.S. Documentary Special Jury Award: Emerging Filmmaker - Parker Hill and Isabel Bethencourt for Cusp
 U.S. Documentary Special Jury Award: Nonfiction Experimentation - Theo Anthony for All Light, Everywhere
 World Cinema Documentary Special Jury Award: Vérité Filmmaking - Camilla Nielsson for President
 World Cinema Documentary Special Jury Award: Impact for Change - Rintu Thomas and Sushmit Ghosh for Writing with Fire
 World Cinema Dramatic Special Jury Award: Acting - Jesmark Scicluna for Luzzu
 World Cinema Dramatic Special Jury Award: Creative Vision - Baz Poonpiriya for One for the Road

Short Film Awards
 Short Film Grand Jury Prize - Lizard 
 Short Film Jury Award: U.S. Fiction - The Touch of the Master's Hand 
 Short Film Jury Award: International Fiction - Bambirak 
 Short Film Jury Award: Nonfiction - Don't Go Tellin' Your Momma 
 Short Film Jury Award: Animation - Souvenir Souvenir 
 Short Film Special Jury Award for Acting - Wiggle Room 
 Short Film Special Jury Award for Screenwriting - The Criminals

Special Prizes
 Alfred P. Sloan Feature Film Prize - Son of Monarchs
 Sundance Institute/Amazon Studios Producers Award for Nonfiction - Nicole Salazar for Philly D.A.
 Sundance Institute/Amazon Studios Producers Award for Fiction - Natalie Qasabian for Run
 Sundance Institute/Adobe Mentorship Award for Editing Nonfiction - Juli Vizza
 Sundance Institute/Adobe Mentorship Award for Editing Fiction - Terilyn Shropshire
 Sundance Institute/NHK Award - Meryam Joobeur for Motherhood

Acquisitions 
Sources:

 Ailey: Neon
 All Light, Everywhere: Super LTD
 Bring Your Own Brigade: CBSN
 Censor: Magnet Releasing (US distribution); Vertigo Releasing (UK distribution); Metro-Goldwyn-Mayer (worldwide)
 CODA: Apple TV+
 Cryptozoo: Magnolia Pictures
 Cusp: Showtime Documentary Films
 El Planeta: Utopia
 Faya Dayi: MUBI (select territories, including UK and Latin America)
 First Date: Magnet Releasing
 Flee: Neon and Participant (US distribution); Curzon Artificial Eye (UK distribution); Haut et Court (French distribution)
 A Glitch in the Matrix: Magnolia Pictures (US distribution); Dogwoof (UK distribution)
 Hive: Zeitgeist Films and Kino Lorber (US distribution)
 Homeroom: Hulu (US distribution)
 How It Ends: American International Pictures (US distribution; through United Artists Releasing)
 I Was a Simple Man: Strand Releasing
 Jockey: Sony Pictures Classics
 John and the Hole: IFC Films
 Luzzu: Kino Lorber (US distribution); Peccadillo Pictures (UK distribution)
 Marvelous and the Black Hole: FilmRise
 Mayday: Magnolia Pictures
 Misha and the Wolves: Netflix (US distribution); BBC Storyville (UK distribution)
 The Most Beautiful Boy in the World: Juno Films
 On the Count of Three: Annapurna Pictures and Orion Pictures (US distribution; through United Artists Releasing)
 Passing: Netflix
 Playing with Sharks: National Geographic Documentary Films
 Pleasure: A24 (Later acquired by NEON)
 Prisoners of the Ghostland: RLJE Films
 Rebel Hearts: Discovery+
 Rita Moreno: Just a Girl Who Decided to Go for It: Roadside Attractions
 The Sparks Brothers: Focus Features (US distribution); Universal Pictures (International distribution)
 Strawberry Mansion: Music Box Films (US distribution); Alief (International distribution)
 Street Gang: How We Got to Sesame Street: Screen Media Films (US distribution); LevelFilm (Canada)
 Summer of Soul: Searchlight Pictures and Hulu (worldwide); Star (select territories)
 Superior: Factory 25 (US distribution); Visit Films (international sales); Creative Artists Agency (US sales)
 Together Together: Bleecker Street (US distribution); Sony Pictures Worldwide Acquisitions (International distribution)
 Violation: Shudder
 Wiggle Room: Searchlight Pictures
 Wild Indian: Vertical Entertainment

References

External links

Sundance Film Festival
Sundance Film Festival
Sundance Film Festival
2021 in American cinema
January 2021 events in the United States
February 2021 events in the United States